Heterostegane ruberata is a moth of the  family Geometridae. It is found in Madagascar.

It has a wingspan of 17–18 mm. The forewings are rather broad with the apex round-pointed, whitish buff, coarsely and profusely irrorated with ochraceous-tawny. The underside is pale, with slight suffusions but without irrorations.

References

Abraxini
Moths described in 1900
Moths of Madagascar
Moths of Africa